Dooling is a town in Dooly County, Georgia, United States. The population was 68 at the 2020 census.

History
The Georgia General Assembly incorporated the place in 1907 as the "Town of Dooling". The community was named after the maiden name of Ellen Dooling, the wife of a first settler. A post office called Dooling was established in 1890, and remained in operation until 1960.

Geography

Dooling is located in northwestern Dooly County at  (32.229962, -83.928311).

Demographics

2020 census

Note: the US Census treats Hispanic/Latino as an ethnic category. This table excludes Latinos from the racial categories and assigns them to a separate category. Hispanics/Latinos can be of any race.

2000 Census
As of the census of 2000, there were 163 people, 54 households, and 38 families residing in the town. The racial makeup of the town was 28.83% White, 66.87% African American, 3.68% from other races, and 0.61% from two or more races. Hispanic or Latino of any race were 4.29% of the population.

There were 54 households, out of which 40.7% had children under the age of 18 living with them, 40.7% were married couples living together, 20.4% had a female householder with no husband present, and 29.6% were non-families. 27.8% of all households were made up of individuals, and 11.1% had someone living alone who was 65 years of age or older. The average household size was 3.02 and the average family size was 3.74.

In the town, the population was spread out, with 39.3% under the age of 18, 9.8% from 18 to 24, 25.8% from 25 to 44, 19.0% from 45 to 64, and 6.1% who were 65 years of age or older. The median age was 27 years. For every 100 females, there were 89.5 males. For every 100 females age 18 and over, there were 76.8 males.

The median income for a household in the town was $20,469, and the median income for a family was $21,719. Males had a median income of $21,875 versus $16,771 for females. The per capita income for the town was $8,976. About 27.0% of families and 33.7% of the population were below the poverty line, including 38.0% of those under the age of 18 and 100.0% of those 65 or over.

References

Towns in Dooly County, Georgia
Towns in Georgia (U.S. state)
Populated places established in 1989